The Rugby League Writers' Association is made up from accredited members of the English news media who write about rugby league in newspapers or present for television and radio programmes.

Members of the Association who are present at the Challenge Cup Final decide which player should be awarded the Lance Todd Trophy for being man of the match.

RLWA Player of the Year
Since 1996, the association has voted on the Player of the Year in recognition of the best performing Super League player that season.

Winners

Merit Award
The Rugby League Writers' Merit Award is awarded annually to a player, coach or official for their services to the game of rugby league. The inaugural winner of the award was Geoff Fletcher in 1982. The award winner is presented with the Arthur Brooks Trophy, named after a former rugby league journalist for the Daily Mirror.

Winners

References

English sportswriters
Journalism-related professional associations
Rugby league mass media
Sports journalism organizations in Europe